Theddy Ongoly (born March 21, 1981 in Sibiti, People's Republic of the Congo) is a Congolese defender who played for Angers SCO in Ligue 2. On loan from Reims in 2006/2007, he had been definitely bought before the 2007/2008 season.

References

Republic of the Congo footballers
Republic of the Congo international footballers
1981 births
Living people
Stade de Reims players
Angers SCO players
Ligue 2 players

Association football defenders